Fārsīwān (Pashto/ or its regional forms: Pārsīwān or Pārsībān, "Persian speaker") is a contemporary designation for Persian speakers in Afghanistan and its diaspora elsewhere. More specifically, it was originally used to refer to a distinct group of farmers in Afghanistan and urban dwellers. In Afghanistan, original Farsiwans are found predominantly in Herat and Farah provinces. They are roughly the same as the Persians of eastern Iran. The term excludes the Hazāra and Aymāq tribes, who also speak dialects of Persian (Hazaragi and Aimaq).

The Farsiwan are often mistakenly referred to as Tajiks. Although the term was originally coined with the Persian lexical root (Pārsībān), the suffix has been transformed into a Pashto form (-wān) and is usually used by the Pashtuns to designate both the Tajiks and the Farsiwans.

Characteristics 
Like the Persians of Iran, the Farsiwan are often distinguished from Tajiks by their adherence to Shia Islam as opposed to the Sunni Islam favored by the majority of Tajiks. However, there are also minor linguistic differences especially among the rural Farsiwan. The Farsiwan sometimes speak a dialect more akin to the Darī dialects of the Persian language, for example the dialect of Kabul,<ref>Ch. M. Kieffer, "Afghanistan v. - Languages of Afghanistan", in Encyclopaedia Iranica, printed version, p. 507 : "[...] 'Dari' is a term long recommended by Afghan authorities to designate Afghan Persian in contrast to Iranian Persian; a written language common to all educated Afghanis, Dari must not be confused with Kaboli, the dialect of Kabul [...] that is more or less understood by more than 80% of the non-Persian speaking population [...]"</ref> as opposed to the standard Tehrānī dialect of Iran. However, most of the Fārsīwān speak the Khorasani'' dialect, native to the Afghanistan–Iran border region, namely Herāt and Farāh, as well as the Iranian provinces of Khorasan. Unlike the Hazara, who are also Persian-speaking and Shia, the Farsiwan do not show any, or very limited, traces of Turkic and Mongol ancestry. Although the Qizilbash of Iran and Afghanistan are also Persian-speaking Shias, they are usually regarded as a separate group from the Farsiwan.

Some confusion arises because an alternative name used locally for the Fārsīwān (as well as for the Tājiks in general) is Dehgān, meaning "village settlers", in the sense of "urban". The term is used in contrast to "nomadic".

Geographic distribution 
There are approximately 1.5 million Farsiwans in Afghanistan, mainly in the provinces of Herat, Farah Ghor, and Mazar-i-Sharif. They are also the main inhabitants of the city of Herāt. Smaller populations can be found in Kabul, Kandahar and Ghazni. Due to the large number of refugees from Afghanistan, significant Farsiwan communities nowadays also exist in Iran (mostly in Mashhad and Tehran).

See also 
 Tajiks
 Persian people
 Persian language
 Persian-speakers of Afghanistan
 Demography of Afghanistan

References 

Iranian peoples
Ethnic groups in Afghanistan
Ethnic groups in Herat Province